Tropicana Brands (pronounced as traa·puh·ka·nuh) is a former American fruit-based beverage company. It was founded in 1947 by Anthony T. Rossi in Bradenton, Florida. Between 1998 and 2021 it was a subsidiary of PepsiCo, but in August 2021, 61% of Tropicana was sold along with the rest of PepsiCo's juice brand portfolio for $3.3 billion to PAI Partners. PepsiCo retained the remaining 39% of ownership.

History

Anthony T. Rossi 
Anthony T. Rossi was born in Sicily, Italy and studied until high school. He immigrated to the United States in 1921 at the age of 21 years. He drove a taxi, was a grocer in New York, then worked as a farmer in Virginia, and then moved to Florida in 1940 where he farmed and was a restaurateur. His first involvement with the Florida citrus industry was fresh fruit gift boxes sold by Macy's and Gimbels department stores in New York City .

In 1947, Rossi settled in Palmetto, Florida, and began packing fruit gift boxes and jars of sectioned fruit for salads under the name Manatee River Packing Company. As the fruit segment business grew, the company moved to a larger location in East Bradenton, Florida, and changed its name to Fruit Industries. The ingredients for the fresh fruit salads on the menu of New York's famed Waldorf-Astoria Hotel were supplied by Fruit Industries. At the East Bradenton location, Rossi began producing frozen, concentrated orange juice as a natural extension to the fruit section business.

Evolution of Tropicana Pure Premium 
In 1952, Rossi purchased the Grapefruit Canning Company in Bradenton. The fresh fruit segments and orange juice business was profitable enough that he discontinued the production of fruit boxes. He developed flash pasteurization in 1954, a process that raised the temperature of juice for a short time to preserve its taste. For the first time, consumers could have the fresh taste of pure not-from-concentrate juice in a chilled package. The juice, Tropicana Pure Premium, became the company's flagship product.

The company developed a trademarked cartoon mascot for the brand called Tropic-Ana, a barefoot young girl carrying oranges on her head and wearing clothing that resembles a Hawaiian grass skirt and lei. She appeared prominently on the juice cartons and even the train cars used to transport the juice. Her image was phased out during the 1980s.

Ed Price was hired as executive vice president and director in 1955 and represented the company as chairman of the Florida Citrus Commission. In 1957, the company's name was changed to Tropicana Products, Inc. to reflect the growing appeal of the Tropicana brand.

Shipping innovations 

Tropicana purchased one million dollars worth of refrigerated trucks to deliver Pure Premium in the mid to late fifties. Soon, 2,000 dairies delivered Pure Premium orange juice to the doorsteps of consumers each morning. By 1958, a ship, S.S. Tropicana, was taking  of juice to New York each week from the new base at Cape Canaveral, Florida. From 1960 to 1970, Tropicana utilized piggyback trailers on flatcars to move the juice more efficiently.

In 1970, Tropicana orange juice was shipped as finished goods via refrigerated boxcars in one weekly round-trip from Florida to Kearny, New Jersey. The "Great White Juice Train" (the first unit train in the food industry, consisting of 150 100-short ton insulated boxcars fabricated in the Alexandria, Virginia shops of Fruit Growers Express) commenced service on June 7, 1971, over the  route. An additional 100 cars were soon incorporated into the fleet, and small mechanical refrigeration units were installed to keep temperatures constant on hot days. In 2004, Tropicana's rail fleet of 514 cars traveled over  – a method that is three times more fuel-efficient than other shipping methods.

Going public and expansion: 1969–1997 
Tropicana Products, Inc. went public in 1969. The stock was first sold over the counter but gained a listing on the New York Stock Exchange under the symbol TOJ. In the same year, it became the first company in the citrus industry to operate its own plastic container manufacturing plant.

Executive vice president Ed Price, who served two terms in the Florida Senate (1958–1966), resigned his position in 1972, but remained on the board of directors until 1983.

Rossi sold Tropicana to Beatrice Foods in 1978. He then retired and was inducted into the Florida Agricultural Hall of Fame in 1987. In 1985, Tropicana debuted Tropicana Pure Premium HomeStyle orange juice, which featured added pulp.

In the 1980s, Tropicana was acquired by The Seagram Company, Ltd. In the decade that followed, they introduced new juice beverage creations, including the orange line of bottled and frozen juice blends.

In the early nineties under Seagram, Tropicana also began to expand distribution to global markets. They formed a partnership to process and distribute Kirin-Tropicana juices in Japan. By that time, the company was also distributing Tropicana Pure Premium in Canada, the United Kingdom, Ireland, France, Germany, Argentina, Panama, and Sweden. As the 1990s continued, Tropicana further expanded internationally, entering several more Latin American countries, Hong Kong and China.

Seagram Beverage Group acquired Dole Food Company's global juice business in 1995, including the Dole brands in North America, and Dole, Fruvita, Looza, and Juice Bowl juices and nectars in Europe.  Dole was operated under Tropicana Dole Beverages North America and Tropicana Dole Beverages International.

Sold to PepsiCo and twenty-first century: 1998–present 
Tropicana was acquired by PepsiCo in 1998, which combined it with the Dole brand for marketing purposes. It has become the world's leading producer of branded fruit juices. Tropicana headquarters moved to Chicago in 2003.

Due to the decreased productivity of Florida's orange crop in the wake of several damaging touches of frost, Tropicana began using a blend of Florida and Brazilian oranges in 2007. Citing an increased consumer interest in the origin of food products, the company announced in February 2012 that its Tropicana Pure Premium line would return to sourcing oranges only from Florida. Tropicana later reverted to sourcing its oranges from both Florida and Brazil due to the Asian citrus psyllid, a microscopic insect that spreads a bacterial disease that causes citrus greening. It is estimated that the disease has killed over 75 percent of Florida's citrus trees.

2009 failed redesign 
In February 2009, Tropicana switched the design on all cartons sold in the United States to a new image created by the Arnell Group. The new image showed the actual orange juice and redesigned the cap to look like the outside of an orange. After less than two months and a 20 percent drop in sales, Tropicana switched back to its original design of an orange skewered by a drinking straw.

2010 carton size 
This change represented a 7.8 percent price-per-ounce increase for consumers.

2018 carton size 

Pending joint venture with PAI Partners (2021–present)
On August 3, 2021, PepsiCo announced that they would sell a majority stake in  Tropicana, Naked Juice, and other juice brands to PAI Partners for $3.3 billion, to concentrate on their healthy snack foods and zero-calorie beverages. They would retain a 39% stake in the new joint-venture company and have exclusive distribution rights to the brands in the USA.

Not-for-profit affiliations 
In 2008, Tropicana started the "Rescue Rainforest" campaign in the U.S. in collaboration with the charity Cool Earth. People could buy special promotional packs of Tropicana and enter the pack's code online. For each code entered,  of rainforest would be saved. The project was based in the Ashaninka corridor in Peru, which lies in an arc of deforestation. As of June 2009, over  had been saved.

Along with launching the Rescue Rainforest initiative, Tropicana has been trying to reduce their carbon footprint by encouraging carton recycling and supporting the Sustainable Forestry Initiative.

Other products 
Pepsi produces fruit flavored soft drinks called Tropicana Twister Soda.

This soft drink line has largely replaced Pepsi's Slice soft drinks. Tropicana also has Fruit Snacks, and in the United Kingdom makes smoothies.

Trop50, introduced by Tropicana in 2009, is orange juice with 50 percent less sugar and calories, and no artificial sweeteners (this has Reb A or PureVia which is a form of the plant Stevia, but is chemically altered.) Trop50 is available in several varieties including Farmstand Apple, Pomegranate Blueberry, Pineapple Mango, Orange, Lemonade, and Raspberry Lemonade.

A number of their juice products, designed for 'extended shelf life', are colored with the extract of cochineal beetles. As this previously embarrassed the company, they use 'Carmine' on the label which is an alternate name for the dye.

In 2010, the company announced the incoming limited release of Tropolis, a liquid fruit snack drink, for January 2011.

In March 2011, the IRI named Trop50 as one of the "Top 10 Food and Beverage Brands in 2010".

Apple juice marketed under the Tropicana Brand by Pepsi Canada uses Canadian apples and has a darker shade and more authentic color than the pale transparent juice marketed in the USA.

In celebration of National Orange Juice Day on May 4, 2022, Tropicana released Tropicana Crunch, a limited-edition cereal "made just for orange juice". The cereal consisted primarily of oats, wheat, brown sugar, rice, almonds, and honey. Many people reviewed the product on social media platforms like TikTok and YouTube.

Naming rights 
Tropicana holds sponsorship to Tropicana Field in St. Petersburg, Florida, the home to the baseball team Tampa Bay Rays. The name of the Bradenton Juice baseball team of the South Coast League was indicative of Tropicana's headquarters which were located in [[Bradenton, Florida].

Headquarters 
The headquarters of Tropicana Products are in Chicago, Illinois. PepsiCo, the parent company of Tropicana, planned to begin moving Tropicana employees into its existing Chicago facility in the first quarter of 2004. PepsiCo moved Tropicana into Chicago so all of its juice brands would be consolidated into one Chicago-based unit.

Until 2004, Tropicana Products was headquartered in the four-story Rossi Office Building in Bradenton, Florida. In 2004, the building, which was completed in 2002, was offered for $20 million. In 2007, it was sold to Bealls of Florida. The 149,000 square foot building was renamed the E. R. Beall Center.

Footnotes

Sources 
Rossi's bio at the Florida Agriculture Hall of Fame class of 1987
Sanna Barlow Rossi. (1986) Anthony T. Rossi, Christian and Entrepreneur: The Story of the Founder of Tropicana.  Inter-Varsity Press.

External links 

 
Tropicana Europe Aseptic Bottle-Filling Line
Ask an Academic: Orange Juice

Drink companies of the United States
Citrus industry in Florida
PepsiCo brands
Food and drink companies established in 1947
1947 establishments in Florida
Companies based in Manatee County, Florida
Bradenton, Florida
1998 mergers and acquisitions